Ballyboy is a barony in County Offaly (formerly King's County), Republic of Ireland.

Etymology
Ballyboy barony derives its name from the village of Ballyboy (Irish Baile Átha Buí, "settlement of the yellow ford").

Location

Ballyboy barony is located in central County Offaly. The Silver River flows through it.

List of settlements

Below is a list of settlements in Ballyboy barony:
Ballyboy
Kilcormac
Mountbolus

References

Baronies of County Offaly